William Rock Painter (August 27, 1863 – July 1, 1947) was a Democratic politician from the state of Missouri. He was the state's 28th Lieutenant Governor and later a State Senator.

Personal history
William R. Painter was born in Carroll County, Missouri. He received his higher education at the Missouri School of Mines (now known as Missouri University of Science and Technology) and following graduation worked as a civil engineer. In 1894 Painter left the engineering field to become editor and publisher of the Daily and Weekly Democrat, newspaper in Carroll County. Painter married Cora Herndon January 12, 1888. They had three daughters and two sons. Painter died in July 1947 and is buried in Oak Hill Cemetery, Carrollton, Missouri.

Political history
William R. Painter was elected Missouri Lieutenant Governor in November 1912, and served in that office from January 1913 to January 1917. Soon after leaving office he was appointed as chairman of the (Missouri) Prison Board in 1917. and even served as prison warden for a period of nearly ten months in 1917. Painter finished his political career as state Senator from the Missouri 8th District, a position he held until 1930.

References

1863 births
1947 deaths
Lieutenant Governors of Missouri
Democratic Party Missouri state senators
American civil engineers
Missouri University of Science and Technology alumni
People from Carroll County, Missouri
19th-century American newspaper publishers (people)
20th-century American newspaper publishers (people)
American male journalists
19th-century American engineers
Journalists from Missouri
Engineers from Missouri
20th-century American politicians